In enzymology, a homospermidine synthase (spermidine-specific) is an enzyme that catalyzes the chemical reaction

spermidine + putrescine  sym-homospermidine + propane-1,3-diamine

Thus, the two substrates of this enzyme are spermidine and putrescine, whereas its two products are sym-homospermidine and propane-1,3-diamine.

This enzyme belongs to the family of transferases, specifically those transferring aryl or alkyl groups other than methyl groups.  The systematic name of this enzyme class is spermidine:putrescine 4-aminobutyltransferase (propane-1,3-diamine-forming).

References

 
 
 

EC 2.5.1
Enzymes of unknown structure